Korattur is situated in the western part of Chennai. It is a part of the Ambattur Zone of Chennai Corporation and located along the Chennai-Bangalore/Mumbai railroad about 12 km from the Chennai Central. It is developed with TNHB Layouts similar to Anna Nagar and the southern section of Korattur located near Padi is often considered to be an integral part of Anna Nagar.

The place has developed from being a calm village in the early 20th century to an urban township of today due to the expansion of the Chennai city and the industrial development of west part of Chennai. The neighbourhood is served by Korattur railway station of the Chennai Suburban Railway. The main road (East and Central Avenue) have been laid as four-lane road with a median, such that each side has a two lanes with parking facility.

Korattur is dotted with thick foliage. The main road leading from Padi is populated with thick and old trees on both sides, so much so that the canopy renders the sky only partially visible. There are many other streets with such high tree-density, most notably the 18th Street and 12th/15th Street junction. Korattur is one of the place in Chennai to have detailed and planned TNHB colony and surrounded with thick greenery and trees around all places. In the recent past the old flats are replaced by new apartment complexes.

Location in context

Educational institutions
Korattur has some CBSE and Matriculation schools, Private Institutes. They are Ghurudev Education and Training Private Limited, Bhaktavatsalam Vidyashram, Dr. Nalli Kuppuswami Vivekananda Vidyalaya Junior College, Little Holy Angels Matriculation Higher Secondary School, Ebenezer Matriculation Higher Secondary School, and Good Shepherd Matriculation Higher Secondary School. Korattur also has a women's college named Bhaktavatsalam Memorial College.

Transport

Though located around 10–13 km away from many central places in the city, Korattur is well-linked by public transport. Local trains (EMU) starting from Chennai Central /Velachery Railway station to Avadi / Tiruvallur / Arakkonam stop at Korattur. City bus services are 35 from Parry's Corner,  41D from Mandaveli to Ambattur via Korattur Central Avenue, S75 from Ambattur to Lucas TVS via Korattur Bus Terminus, S42 from Maduravoyal.

Places of worship
There are few Hindu Temples, the oldest being Jambookeshwar Temple old Earikarai Sri Siyathamman Temple.  A mosque and two churches: Holy Trinity Church and Infant Jesus. The other temples are Lakshminarayanan Perumal for Vishnu (adjacent to Jambookeshwarar temple), Sai Baba temple in East Avenue (Main Road), Nagavalli Amman temple (38th main street), Vijayashakthi Vinayakar Temple in north Srinivasapuram, Pillayar Koil (next to police station), Anjaneyar temple (near the bus stand), Sri Vilvanathar temple (Lakshmana Mudali 2nd st), Sri Throwpathy Amman Kovil, Sri Muthumari Amman Temple where one can also find the shrine of Shri Sridi Sai Baba within the temple premises and Yoga Anjaneyar temple with Munishwaran shrine in the same premises along the banks of Korattur Eri. The population is predominantly Hindu, with many Brahmins, but quite a number of Muslims and Christians also live here peacefully and successfully.

Recreational centres
Theatres include Green Cinemas (multiplex) near Britannia bus stop.
The Korattur Lake present north of the railway line, is an important sightseeing place in this town. Apart from being a water reservoir that is useful to people here, it also acts as a buffer during rains. This lake is also home to a wide variety of animals. Over 50 species of birds can be seen in the wild in this lake, particularly in winter months. This lake is a major attraction to wildlife and bird enthusiasts in north Chennai. Despite major habitat loss in the present decade, this lake still houses a good animal and plant life.

See also

Transport in Chennai

References

External links

Neighbourhoods in Chennai
Suburbs of Chennai